Statistics from the 2015–16 season.

Table 

2015-16
Martinique
football
football